The Port of Tangshan is an artificial deep-water international seaport on the coast of Tangshan Municipality, Hebei, in Northern China. It is the 9th largest port in China and is composed of three separate port areas: Jingtang, Caofeidian and Fengnan (丰南), administered separately but considered to be the same port for statistical purposes. The Port of Tangshan is one of the fastest-growing ports in the world and is counted among the ten largest ports of China.

History

Layout

The port of Tangshan consists of three separate port areas: Jingtang, Caofeidian and Fengnan. These are administered separately and have different UNLocodes, but are often considered to be the same port for statistical purposes. The closest airport to the port is Tianjin which is 2 hours away. A new high speed train under construction will shorten the distance from Beijing to Tangshan to  less than 2 hours.

Operations

References

External links
Jingtang Port website
Caofeidian Port website
Hebei Port Group website

Ports and harbours of China